Budislav Šoškić (1925–1979) was a politician from Socialist Republic of Montenegro and member of League of Communists of Yugoslavia.

Biography
Šoškić was born in Novi Pazar and had studied at the University of Belgrade. He was the last President of the People's Assembly of the Socialist Republic of Montenegro who also was head of state. After him, on 5 April 1974, his seat was transformed in "President of the Presidency". He served as speaker from 1974 to 1979.

See also
President of the Parliament of Montenegro

References

Yugoslav Partisans members
1925 births
1979 deaths
Place of birth missing
League of Communists of Montenegro politicians
Montenegrin communists
Politicians from Novi Pazar